Hastie is both a surname and a given name. Notable people with the name include:

Surname 

 Alex Hastie (1935–2010), Scottish rugby union player
 Andrew Hastie (field hockey) (born 1970), New Zealand field hockey player 
 Andrew Hastie (politician) (born 1982), Australian Member of Parliament
 Archibald Hastie (20th century), Scottish footballer
 Harry Hastie (fl. 1919–1920), English footballer
 Ian Hastie (1887– after 1911), English footballer
 Iain Hastie (fl. 1971–2), New Zealand footballer
 Jake Hastie (born 1999), Scottish footballer
 Jim / James Hastie (disambiguation), multiple people
 John Hastie, multiple people
 Karen Hastie Williams (born 1944), American lawyer and company director
 Trevor Hastie (born 1953), American statistician
 William H. Hastie (1904-1976), first African American Governor of the United States Virgin Islands
 Willie Hastie (born 1924), Scottish footballer

Given name 

 Thomas Hastie Bell (1867-1942), Scottish anarchist

Fictional characters 

 Hastie Lanyon, a fictional character in Strange Case of Dr Jekyll and Mr Hyde

See also
 Hasty (disambiguation)